The following list includes notable people who were born or have lived in Portsmouth, New Hampshire.

Academics and science 

 John Knowlton Bartlett (1816–1899), physician
 Edmund March Blunt (1770–1862), navigator, publisher
 E. Warren Clark (1849–1907), educator
 Alfred L. Elwyn (1804–1884), physician, pioneer in the training and care of the mentally disabled
 Laurence G. Leavitt (1903–2000), headmaster of Vermont Academy
 Richard A. Searfoss (1956–2018), astronaut
 Count Rumford (1753–1814), physicist, inventor; Count of the Holy Roman Empire
 Frederick Pearson Treadwell (1857–1918), chemist

Arts and architecture 

 Alfred Thompson Bricher (1837–1908), artist
 Marc Drogin (1936–2017), writer and illustrator
 William Harrison Folsom (1815–1901), architect
 Jim McDermott (born 1960), painter, illustrator, cartoonist

Business 

 Brooke Astor (1902–2007), socialite, philanthropist; chairwoman of the Vincent Astor Foundation
 Robert Harris (1830–1894), railway president
 Paul Waterman (1964-present), businessman, conservationist, owner of the Library Restaurant

Judiciary 

 Edward Henry Durell (1810–1887), US federal judge
 John L. Rand (1861–1942), 22nd Chief Justice of the Oregon Supreme Court
 John Samuel Sherburne (1757–1830), soldier, US federal judge
 Samuel Treat (1815–1902), US federal judge
 Joshua Winslow (1726–1801), soldier, politician, judge

Media 

 Bill Alfonso (born 1957), former pro wrestling referee and manager (born William Matthew Sierra in Portsmouth)
 Tom Bergeron (born 1955), TV presenter, game show host
 Peter Bonerz (born 1938), actor, director
 Samantha Brown (born 1970), Travel Channel host, TV personality
 William F. Haddock (1877–1969), film director of the silent film era
 Jean Kasem (born 1954), actress
 Milton Selzer (1918–2006), stage, film, and television actor
 Ilene Woods (1929–2010), actress, voice of Cinderella

Military 

 Charles C. Carpenter (1834–1899), United States Navy rear admiral who rose to command of the Asiatic Squadron; resided in Portsmouth
 Francis Cogswell (1887–1939), U.S. Navy captain; Navy Cross recipient for actions during World War I
 Frederick Franklin (1840–1873), U.S. Navy quartermaster; Medal of Honor recipient (1871 Korean Campaign)
 Mark G. Ham (1820–1869), U.S. Navy sailor; Medal of Honor recipient (American Civil War)
 John Hart (1706–1777), colonel in the New Hampshire militia
 Charles Hovey (1885–1911), U.S. Navy officer (Philippine–American War)
 John Paul Jones (1747–1792), "father" of U.S. Navy
 Nathaniel Meserve (1704–1758), shipwright, soldier
 Enoch Greenleafe Parrott (1814–1879), U.S. Navy rear admiral (Mexican–American War and American Civil War)
 Fitz John Porter (1822–1901), Union Army major general (American Civil War)
 Robert H. Wyman (1822–1882), U.S. Navy rear admiral

Music 

 Al Barr (born 1968), musician & lead singer of Dropkick Murphys and The Bruisers
 Gina Catalino (born 1984), singer-songwriter
 Ronnie James Dio (1942–2010), singer-songwriter
 Geoff Palmer (born 1980), musician, singer, and songwriter. Member of The Connection, The Kurt Baker band, and The Queers
 Tom Rush (born 1941), singer-songwriter
 Bill Staines (born 1947), folk musician
 Joseph P King also known by the stage Joe Queer. Lead singer and guitarist of the punk rock band The Queers.

Politics 

 Amos T. Akerman (1821–1880), US attorney general
 Ichabod Bartlett (1786–1853), US congressman
 Clifton Clagett (1762–1829), US congressman
 Renny Cushing (1962–2022), New Hampshire state represenntative
 Samuel Cushman (1783–1851), US congressman
 John Cutt (1613–1681), merchant, mill owner, and provincial president of New Hampshire
 Charles Cutts (1769–1846), US senator
 Charles M. Dale (1893–1978), mayor, state senator, and the 66th governor of New Hampshire
 William S. Damrell (1809–1860), US congressman
 John A. Durkin (1936–2012), US senator
 Eileen Foley (1918–2016), eight-term mayor of Portsmouth (1968–1971, 1984–1985, 1988–1997), state senator, and former minority leader of the New Hampshire Senate
 Ichabod Goodwin (1794–1882), 34th governor of New Hampshire
 William Hale (1765–1848), US congressman
 Nathaniel Appleton Haven (1762–1831), US congressman
 Andrew Jarvis (1890–1990), mayor and member of the Governor's Council
 Frank Jones (1832–1902), businessman, US congressman, mayor
 John Langdon (1741–1819), Founding Father of the United States, merchant, President pro tempore of the US senate, and the governor of New Hampshire (2nd, 4th, 8th & 10th)
 Woodbury Langdon (1739–1805), Founding Father, merchant, statesman, judge; Delegate from New Hampshire to the Continental Congress
 Tobias Lear (1762–1816), personal secretary to President George Washington; Lear served Washington from 1784 until the former-President's death in 1799
 Edward St. Loe Livermore (1762–1832), US congressman
 Pierse Long (1739–1789), colonel of the Continental Army in the Revolutionary War, merchant, US senator
 Henry B. Lovering (1841–1911), US congressman
 Daniel Marcy (1809–1893), US congressman
 Richard Martyn (1630–1694), early Portsmouth representative, speaker of the house, chief justice
 John Fabyan Parrott (1767–1836), US congressman and senator
 Charles H. Peaslee (1804–1866), US congressman and lawyer
 Joseph Peirce (1748–1812), US congressman and soldier
 John J. Perry (1811–1897), US congressman
 Wesley Powell (1915–1981), lawyer and 70th Governor of New Hampshire
 John Randall Reding (1805–1892), US congressman
 James Sheafe (1755–1829), US congressman and senator
 James R. Splaine (born 1947), New Hampshire state legislator, Portsmouth vice-mayor
 Clement Storer (1760–1830), US congressman, senator
 Daniel Webster (1782–1852), US senator from Massachusetts and the 14th and 19th US Secretary of State
 Benning Wentworth (1696–1770), colonial governor of New Hampshire from 1741 to 1766
 Sir John Wentworth (1737–1820), the British colonial governor of New Hampshire at the time of the American Revolution; he was later also Lieutenant-Governor of Nova Scotia
 William Whipple (1731–1785), ship's captain, merchant, Founding Father, signatory of the United States Declaration of Independence; represented New Hampshire as a member of the Continental Congress from 1776 through 1779

Religion 

 Joseph Stevens Buckminster (1784–1812), minister
 Samuel Langdon (1723–1797), clergyman, educator, college president
 Samuel Parker (1744–1804), bishop

Sports 

 Jane Blalock (born 1945), golfer with the LPGA Tour
 George Haddock (1866–1926), Major League Baseball pitcher from 1888 to 1894
 Eric Jenkins (born 1991), Olympic 1500m athlete
Josh Owens (born 1988), basketball player for Hapoel Tel Aviv of the Israeli Basketball Premier League
 Dick Scott (1933–2020), pitcher with the Los Angeles Dodgers and Chicago Cubs

Slavery 

 Oney Judge (1773–1848), runaway slave
 Prince Whipple (1750–1796), slave

Writing 

 John Greenleaf Adams (1810–1897), hymn writer
 Thomas Bailey Aldrich (1836–1907), poet, novelist, editor
 Helen Dore Boylston (1895–1984), author
 Elliott Coues (1842–1899), surgeon, historian, author
 Clayton Emery (born 1953), author
 James T. Fields (1817–1881), publisher, author
 Harriet McEwen Kimball (1834–1917), poet, hymnwriter, philanthropist, hospital co-founder
 Eliza Lee (1792–1864), author
 John Lord (1810–1894), historian, lecturer 
 Samuel Penhallow (1665–1726), historian, militia leader in present-day Maine during Queen Anne's War and Father Rale's War
 Benjamin Penhallow Shillaber (1814–1890), printer, editor, humorist
 Celia Thaxter (1835–1894), poet, writer

References

Portsmouth, New Hampshire
Portsmouth